Haburman Bridge, also known as Çermik Bridge, ( or Çermik Köprüsü) is a historic bridge in Diyarbakır Province, southeastern Turkey.

The bridge is in Çermik ilçe (district) of Diyarbakır Province. It is built over Sinek creek which is a tributary of Fırat River (Euphrates).

According to the inscription of the bridge it was commissioned by Zübeyde Hatun (princess) of Artuqids in 1179. She was the daughter of Necmettin Alpi of the Mardin branch. It was restored in 1927. In 2010, after the construction of a new bridge the bridge was closed to the vehicle traffic.

There is no parapet. There are two auxiliary arches (for discharging)  on each side. Main construction material is limestone. In certain parts brick has also been used.

References

Bridges in Diyarbakır
Stone bridges in Turkey
Bridges completed in 1179
Artuqids
Arch bridges in Turkey
Çermik